Townshend Stith Brandegee (February 16, 1843 – April 7, 1925) was an American botanist. He was an authority on the flora of Baja California and the Channel Islands of California.

Early life
Brandegee was born on February 16, 1843, in Berlin, Connecticut. From 1862 to 1864 he served in the Connecticut Artillery and later decided to become an engineer. He got his degree in engineering from Sheffield Scientific School but then pursued botany after he participated at some classes with Daniel Cady Eaton in Yale University. When he graduated from there, he became a county surveyor and city engineer at Canon City, Colorado where in free time he also collected certain species of plants. He was accustomed with John H. Redfield and Asa Gray the later of which suggested him to join Ferdinand V. Hayden's expedition to southwest Colorado and Utah where he will use his surveyor skills as well as botanical. He was hired as a railroad surveyor in both Arkansas and New Mexico and continued with plant collecting. Later on, he was hired at the Northern Transcontinental Survey and created a map of Adirondack region. On his journey he visited Santa Cruz and Santa Rosa Islands on one of which he collected wood for Charles Sprague Sargent.

Work, marriage and publications
Soon after it, he moved to San Francisco where he became a member California Academy of Sciences and continued studying plants there and in Baja California, Mexico. Besides being a member of the CAS he was also a member of Botanical Society of America, National Geographical Society, Sigma Xi and a fellow at the American Association for the Advancement of Science. From 1889 to 1906 he wrote a 12-volume work called Plantae Mexicanae Purpusianae which was published in collaboration with Carl A. Purpus. He married a fellow botanist named Katharine Layne Curran in San Diego in 1889. In 1906 he moved to Berkeley, California where he died on April 7, 1925.

Further reading
 Republished ("somewhat abridged") in Eden 14(4): 1–9.

References

American taxonomists
1843 births
1925 deaths
Botanists active in California
People associated with the California Academy of Sciences
Scientists from California
Yale School of Engineering & Applied Science alumni
American expatriates in Mexico
Botanists active in North America
19th-century American botanists
20th-century American botanists